This is a Mordvin name; the given name is Sandra.

Aleksandr Markovich Sharonov (born 18 February 1942) (alias Sharononj Sandra (Erzya language: Шарононь Сандра, Šaronoń Sandra) is a Mordvin (Russian) philologist (Finno-Ugric languages), folklorist, poet and prose writer.

His research and social interests include history, mythology and folklore of Erzya and Moksha peoples.

Works

Устно-поэтическое творчество мордовского народа (1977)
Mastorava an epic poem based on Mordvin mythology and folklore, written in Erzya (1994), translated in Moksha, Russian, and Hungarian languages
Мордовский героический эпос (2001)
На земле Инешкипаза (2006)
Потехония, a science fiction novel (2012)
Эрзя, Меря, Русь в историографии России (2013)
Планета Эра, poetry and prose (2014)

Recognition
1997: Matthias Castrén Society Literary Prize, Finland
1996: Mordovia State Prize, Russia

References

1942 births
Living people
People from Mordovia
Mordvin people
Russian male poets
Russian philologists
Soviet philologists
20th-century philologists
Soviet poets
Soviet male writers
20th-century Russian male writers
Erzyan-language writers